The Sun has appeared as a setting in fiction since at least classical antiquity.

Inhabited 
Many early depictions of the Sun portray it as having inhabitants. Lucian of Samosata's work True History from the second century CE, described by science fiction scholar Gary Westfahl as the first depiction of space travel in fiction, has the inhabitants of the Sun being at war with those of the Moon. Other stories with an inhabited Sun include Athanasius Kircher's 1656 work Itinerarium exstaticum and Cyrano de Bergerac's 1657 novel Comical History of the States and Empires of the Moon. The concept of the plurality of worlds—the notion that other heavenly bodies should be essentially Earth-like and therefore habitable—endured in fiction with regard to the Sun well into the 1800s. These works include George Fowler's 1813 novel A Flight to the Moon; or, The Vision of Randalthus, the anonymously published 1837 novel Journeys into the Moon, Several Planets and the Sun, and Joel R. Peabody's 1838 novel A World of Wonders.

In the 1900s, more exotic Solar lifeforms started appearing in fiction. Some of these live inside the Sun itself rather than on its surface, as in Jack Williamson's 1935 short story "Islands of the Sun", Raymond Z. Gallun's 1935 short story "Nova Solis", and Nat Schachner's 1938  short story "The Sun-World of Soldus". Others take up residence elsewhere in the Solar System: in Leigh Brackett's 1942 short story "Child of the Sun", an intelligent alien from the Sun lives on the fictional planet Vulcan inside the orbit of Mercury, and the titular creatures of Olaf Stapledon's 1947 novel The Flames are lizard-like Solar beings residing inside igneous rocks on Earth. Edmond Hamilton's 1962 short story "Sunfire!" depicts an energy-based lifeform living in the Sun's corona.

Disaster 

The dimming or extinction of the Sun has been a recurring theme. The earliest such stories were inspired by the assumption that the heat and light of the Sun were products of combustion, and that the fuel sustaining it would eventually run out. Lord Kelvin estimated in 1862 that the Sun would fade within a few million years, a timeframe that would be incorporated in stories by Camille Flammarion and H. G. Wells, among others.

Several stories depict the Sun "going nova".

Phenomena

Eclipses 

Solar eclipses are plot points in many stories.

Sunspots 
The 11-year Solar cycle of sunspot activity appears in a small number of works.

Solar wind 

The Solar wind is occasionally exploited for Solar sail-propelled spacecraft.

Close encounters 
The Sun appears as a hazard to spaceships that approach it too closely in some stories.

Sentient 
Some works depict the Sun as being sentient. In fictional mythologies, the Sun is usually male, though some exceptions exist such as the legendarium of J. R. R. Tolkien, where it is female.

See also 

 The Sun in culture

References